Live Sessions is the third EP by American pop-rock singer-songwriter Matt Hires, released on March 8, 2011. This new release is a compilation of five live tracks, recorded with a full band at various times during Hires' 2009–2010 State Lines Tour. Upon its release, the EP broke into the top 10 on the iTunes Singer-Songwriter chart.

The EP featured three previously released material, as well as a new track "I Always Lose", and a cover of the American rock band MGMT's hit song "Kids".

Background

Cover artwork
The ep's coverart was design and made by C1 Design & Photography. The original photo was taken by Rebecca Siegrist, the Creative Director and Founder of C1 Design, at the State Lines Tour.

Concept

Track listing
Live Sessions

References 

2011 EPs
Matt Hires albums
Atlantic Records EPs